Stefan Skoumal (29 November 1909 – 28 November 1983) was an Austrian football midfielder.

He earned 4 caps for the Austria national football team. After the annexation of Austria by Germany, he earned 3 caps for the Germany national football team, and participated in the 1938 FIFA World Cup. He spent his club career at SK Rapid Wien.

References

1909 births
1983 deaths
Association football midfielders
Austrian footballers
Austria international footballers
German footballers
Germany international footballers
SK Rapid Wien players
1938 FIFA World Cup players
Dual internationalists (football)